Enhancement may refer to:

Human body enhancement
 Breast enhancement, breast enlargement or contouring
 Cleavage enhancement, an increase in the definition of breast cleavage
 Contrast enhancement, enhancement of the contrast of structures or fluids within the body in medical imaging after administration of a contrast medium.
 Genetic enhancement, the use of genetic engineering to modify a person's nonpathological human traits
 Human enhancement, augmentation of the human body to increase capability
 Male enhancement, a euphemism for penis enlargement

Image enhancement
 Edge enhancement, an image-processing filter that increases the contrast of shape borders to improve its acutance (apparent sharpness)
 Image enhancement, improvement to perceived image quality
 Shadow and highlight enhancement, an image processing technique to correct exposure

Acoustical signal enhancement
 Acoustic enhancement, the augmentation of direct, reflected, or reverberant sound waves without resorting to electronic sound reinforcement
 Blip enhancement, an electronic warfare technique used to fool radar
 Forensic audio enhancement, the scientific analysis and improvement of audio clarity, especially to improve intelligibility
 Orchestral enhancement, using orchestration techniques, architecture, or electronic sound reinforcement to modify the sound of a live musical performance
 Speech enhancement, the improvement of speech quality via audio signal processing

Software enhancement
 Progressive enhancement, a web application design that provides a usable experience to users of a broad spectrum of web browsers, but gives additional features to users of more sophisticated web browsers
 Software enhancement, a proposed or newly added software feature
 Web enhancement, official downloadable content published via the World Wide Web for a video game

Other uses
 Antibody-dependent enhancement, an increase in viral infection facilitated by the host's own antibodies
 Diamond enhancement, a treatment that improves the gemological characteristics of a natural diamond
 Hydrogen fuel enhancement, adding hydrogen to conventional hydrocarbon fuel in an attempt to improve the fuel economy and/or power output of an internal combustion engine
 Input enhancement, a technique for teaching a language to non-native speakers
 Seed enhancement, pre-sowing treatment to improve seed performance
 Self-enhancement, an overly positive self-assessment
 Sexual enhancement, sex toy

See also
 Enhance (disambiguation)